Jacques Heath Futrelle (April 9, 1875 – April 15, 1912) was an American journalist and mystery writer. He is best known for writing short detective stories featuring Professor Augustus S. F. X. Van Dusen, also known as "The Thinking Machine" for his use of logic. He died in the sinking of the RMS Titanic.

Career 
Futrelle was born in Pike County, Georgia. He worked for the Atlanta Journal, where he began their sports section, the New York Herald, the Boston Post and the Boston American, where, in 1905, his Thinking Machine character appeared in a serialized version of the short story, "The Problem of Cell 13".

Futrelle left the Boston American in 1906 to write novels. He had a harbor-view house built in Scituate, Massachusetts, which he called "Stepping Stones" and spent most of his time there until his death in 1912. His last work, My Lady's Garter, was published posthumously in 1912. His widow inscribed in the book, "To the heroes of the Titanic, I dedicate this my husband's book", under a photo of him.

Personal life

In 1895, he married fellow writer Lily May Peel with whom he had two children, Virginia and Jacques "John" Jr.

Death
Returning from Europe aboard the RMS Titanic, Futrelle, a first-class passenger, refused to board a lifeboat, insisting Lily do so instead, to the point of forcing her in. She remembered the last she saw of him: he was smoking a cigarette on deck with John Jacob Astor IV. He perished in the Atlantic and his body was never found. On July 29, 1912, Futrelle's mother, Linnie Futrelle, died in her Georgia home; her death was attributed to grief over her son.

In popular culture
Futrelle is used as the protagonist in Max Allan Collins' disaster series novel The Titanic Murders (1999), about two murders aboard theTitanic.

Selected works

Novels 
 The Chase of the Golden Plate (1906)
 The Simple Case of Susan (1908)
 The Diamond Master (1909) – adapted as a "three-reel photoplay by the  Eclair Co." in 1914 and as silent film serials The Diamond Queen (1921) and The Diamond Master (1929)
 Elusive Isabel (1909)
 The High Hand (1911)
 My Lady's Garter (1912)
 Blind Man's Bluff (1914)

Short story collections 
 The Thinking Machine (1907)
 "The Flaming Phantom"
 "The Great Auto Mystery"
 "The Man Who Was Lost"
 "The Mystery of a Studio"
 "The Problem of Cell 13" (1905)
 "The Ralston Bank Burglary"
 "The Scarlet Thread"
 The Thinking Machine on the Case (1908), UK title The Professor on the Case
 "The Stolen Rubens"

Short stories 
See Augustus S. F. X. Van Dusen and JacquesFutrelle.com for more stories.
 "The Problem of Cell 13" (1905)
 The Gray Ghost (Perth Daily News, 30 September 1905)
 The Man Who Found Kansas (Metropolitan Magazine, April 1906)
 "The Phantom Motor"
 "The Grinning God" (The Sunday Magazine)
 I. "Wraiths of the Storm", by May Futrelle
 II. "The House That Was", by Jacques Futrelle
In this literary experiment, The Thinking Machine provides a rational solution to the seemingly impossible and supernatural events of a ghost story written by Mrs. Futrelle.

References

Further reading

External links 
 Jacques Futrelle (archived 2005-01-11) – stated official website Futrelle.com;  Joe, Robert and Carolyn Futrelle
 
 
 
 
 
 

1875 births
1912 deaths
20th-century American novelists
20th-century American male writers
20th-century American non-fiction writers
20th-century American short story writers
American mystery writers
American male novelists
American male journalists
Deaths on the RMS Titanic
Novelists from Georgia (U.S. state)
Novelists from Massachusetts
People from Pike County, Georgia
People from Scituate, Massachusetts
New York Herald people
The Boston Post people